A kennel club (known as a kennel council or canine council in some countries) is an organization for canine affairs that concerns itself with the breeding, showing and promotion of more than one breed of dog. All-encompassing kennel clubs are also referred to as 'all-breed clubs', although "all" means only those breeds that they have decided to recognize, and "breed" means purebred dogs, not including dog hybrids and crossbreeds or mixed-breed dogs. A club that handles only one breed is known as a breed club.

List

See also
 Dogs portal

References

Kennel